"Time for the Moon Night" (: "Night") is a song recorded by South Korean girl group GFriend for their sixth extended play of the same name. The song was released by Source Music on April 30, 2018. It is the first and only song to achieve a grandslam in 2018, winning all of the six music program trophies consecutively in one week.

The song was written by No Joo-hwan and Lee Won-jong and is GFriend's first single not written by producer duo Iggy and Youngbae.

Composition 
The single has a retro sound reminiscent of Japanese anime soundtracks. Kwak Yeon-soo of The Korea Times described it as a "whimsical dance song with a lyrical melody and dynamic tempo" which "offers introspective lyrics and honest storytelling". Tamar Harman of Billboard described it as "a song that is sprinkled with retro-inspired digital quirks, fluttering synths, and layered harmonies as the members of GFriend sing their way between dynamic tempo and tonal shifts".

Release and promotions
After a seven-month break since the sextet's Summer Rain, GFriend officially returned with their 8th Mini Album: Time for the Moon Night, including their newest single in the same name on April 30, 2018. They release three versions of the album named: "Time Version", "Moon Version" and "Night Version". At the same day, GFriend held a comeback showcase entitled Moon Light: Express 241 at Yes24 Live Hall at Gwangjin-gu. The group performed the lead single, "Time for the Moon Night" and the sidetrack "Love Bug" at the media showcase, which was simultaneously broadcast live via Naver's V-Live app.

GFriend started promoting the album with the performances of their latest songs, "Time for the Moon Night" and "Love Bug" at MCountdown on May 3, 2018, preceding live stages on various music shows on the entire week. In their second week of promotion, the song won first place on every music show with a chart system, making GFriend the first and only artist to achieve a grandslam in 2018. GFriend ended their promotions on May 20th, garnering a total of 10 trophies from all six music programs, thus becoming the third among the group's lead singles with most number of wins, only behind "Rough" and "Navillera".

Chart performance 
The song debuted at number 9 on the Gaon Digital Chart, on the chart issue dated April 29-May 5, 2018, with 28,606,419 points and later peaked at number 2 in its third week with 41,006,851 points It also debuted at number 6 on Billboard Korea's Kpop Hot 100 and peaked at number 3 in its third week.

The song debuted at number 3 on the chart for the month of May 2018, with 155,325,483 points. The song was also included in the half-year chart, landing at number 49 with 280,543,556 points.

Music video 
A music video for the song was released on April 30, 2018. The song's music video shifts the group away from the uniform-inspired, synchronized looks of their previous conceptual eras, and instead individualizes each of the six members.

The music video was directed by Eddie Yoo-jeong Ko of Lumpens.

Live performances 
The group held their first comeback stage on Mnet's M Countdown on May 3, 2018 and ended their promotions on SBS's Inkigayo on May 20.

Accolades

Charts

See also 
 List of M Countdown Chart winners (2018)
List of Inkigayo Chart winners (2018)

References 

2018 songs
2018 singles
GFriend songs
Korean-language songs
Kakao M singles
Music videos directed by Lumpens
Hybe Corporation singles